In the 2014 Indian general election for Gujarat that were held for 26 seats in the state, the major two contenders in the state were Bharatiya Janta Party (BJP) and the Indian National Congress (INC). BJP won all 26 seats.

Results
BJP won all 26 seats

Results- Constituency wise

Bye-election

References

2014
Gujarat
 Indian general elections in Gujarat